Suzzy Williams (died 8 September 2005, aged 23) was a well-known Ghanaian television and film actor. She starred in films such as  Bloody Mary, Calamity, The Comforter and Mother's Heart. Her career as an actor was launched through the African hit film Together Forever, with a screenplay by US-based Ghanaian producer and screenwriter Leila Djansi.

Education 
Williams attended Tema Secondary School, where she was a member of the drama group and sang at entertainment programmes.

Death 
She died in a car crash at Labadi in Accra at the age of 23. The accident happened on the La-Nungua highway on 8 September 2005 at about 1.30 am. She was in the car with her boyfriend. Because of her popularity, Ghana's Art Centre refused to allow her body to lie in state, fearing it would be unable to accommodate the large numbers of mourners expected. The Suzzy Williams Memorial Fund was created  in her memory to aid victims of road traffic accidents. She was Nana Ama McBrown's best friend.

Selected filmography
 The Sisterhood,
 Fresh Trouble
 Ugly Side of Beauty
 War for War
 Together Forever
 Sun-city
 A Touch of Love
 The Comforter
 The Chosen One
 Lover Boy In Ghana
 Official Prostitute
 Yaa Asantewaa

References

External links and sources

 
 "Suzy Williams is Dead", GhanaWeb, 8 September 2005.
 "Suzzy Williams - Dead At 23", ''GhanaWeb.
 Daily Graphic Online

1980s births
2005 deaths
Ghanaian film actresses
Road incident deaths in Ghana
Year of birth missing